Utsumi is a Japanese surname. Notable people with the surname include:

, Japanese voice actor
, Japanese politician and cabinet minister
Takeshi Utsumi, American operations researcher
, Japanese basketball coach
, former secretary general of International Telecommunication Union
, former Capcom sound designer

Fictional characters 
, a character in the anime series SSSS.Gridman
, a character in the novel Battle Royale

Japanese-language surnames